Erwin Marschewski (born 31 March 1940) is a German politician of the Christian Democratic Union (CDU) and former member of the German Bundestag.

Life 
He was a member of the German Bundestag from 29 March 1983 to 2005 (six election periods) and was elected via the state list of the Christian Democratic Union of Germany (CDU) in North Rhine-Westphalia. He was the chairman of the working group on displaced persons and refugees of the CDU/CSU parliamentary group.

Literature

References

1940 births
Members of the Bundestag for North Rhine-Westphalia
Members of the Bundestag 2002–2005
Members of the Bundestag 1998–2002
Members of the Bundestag 1994–1998
Members of the Bundestag 1990–1994
Members of the Bundestag 1987–1990
Members of the Bundestag 1983–1987
Members of the Bundestag for the Christian Democratic Union of Germany
Living people